Alison Jane Sydor (born September 9, 1966) is a Canadian retired professional cross-country mountain cyclist. She began cycling at age 20 and is a graduate of the University of Victoria. She won a silver medal at the 1996 Summer Olympics in mountain bike, and has won three world mountain bike championships gold medals (1994 in Vail, Colorado; 1995 in Kirchzarten, Germany; and 1996 in Cairns, Australia) and the 2002 relay race in Kaprun, Austria.

Sydor has also won five silver medals (1992, 1999, 2000, 2001 and 2003) and three bronze (1998, 1999 (relay race), 2004) at mountain bike world championships, and one bronze at the road world championships (1991).  In addition, Sydor has won 17 World Cup (cross-country) races in her career, and for 13 consecutive years (1992–2004) never finished outside of the top-5 at the world championships.

In 1995 and 1996, Sydor was awarded the Velma Springstead Trophy as Canada's top female athlete.

In September 2007 Sydor was inducted into the Mountain Bike Hall of Fame.

In December 2007 it was announced that Sydor would be inducted into British Columbia Sports Hall of Fame Class of 2008 at a ceremony on May 29, 2008.

Sydor and teammate Pia Sundstedt won the Women's Category in the Absa Cape Epic in 2008. Sydor then came back to win the Mixed Category with Nico Pfitzenmaier in 2009.

In 2013, Sydor was inducted into Canada's Sports Hall of Fame.

Major results 
 UCI Mountain Bike & Trials World Championships
 Gold Medal (Cross Country: 1994, 1995, 1996; Team Relay: 2002)
 Silver Medal (Cross Country: 1992, 1999, 2000, 2001, 2003)
 Bronze Medal (Cross Country: 1998, 2004; Team Relay: 1999)
 UCI Road World Championships
 Bronze Medal (1991)
 Summer Olympics
 Silver Medal (1996)
 4th Place (2004)
 5th Place (2000)
 Commonwealth Games
 Silver Medal (Team Time Trial: 1994)
 Bronze Medal (Road Race: 1994)
 Pan American Games
 Gold Medal (1995)
 Silver Medal (1999)
 Absa Cape Epic
 1st Place Ladies Category 2008
 1st Place Mixed Category 2009

References

External links 
 Mountain Bike Hall of Fame entry
 
 
 
 
 
 
 

1966 births
Living people
Canadian female cyclists
Cross-country mountain bikers
Cyclists at the 1992 Summer Olympics
Cyclists at the 1996 Summer Olympics
Cyclists at the 1999 Pan American Games
Cyclists at the 2000 Summer Olympics
Cyclists at the 2004 Summer Olympics
Olympic cyclists of Canada
Olympic medalists in cycling
Olympic silver medalists for Canada
Sportspeople from Edmonton
Medalists at the 1996 Summer Olympics
UCI Mountain Bike World Champions (women)
Canadian mountain bikers
Commonwealth Games medallists in cycling
Commonwealth Games silver medallists for Canada
Commonwealth Games bronze medallists for Canada
Pan American Games medalists in cycling
Pan American Games gold medalists for Canada
Pan American Games silver medalists for Canada
Cyclists at the 1994 Commonwealth Games
Medalists at the 1995 Pan American Games
Medalists at the 1999 Pan American Games
Medallists at the 1994 Commonwealth Games